"Bastava" / "Bastaba" (literally It Was Enough) is a song recorded by Italian singer Laura Pausini, for her eleventh studio album, Inedito. The song was released on radio on January 20, 2012. In France, it is the third single extracted from the album.

The song was written by Niccolò Agliardi  to Eleonora Crupi, who was taking part on the fifth edition of the talent show Amici di Maria De Filippi, who was refused to Sanremolab (which opens the doors to the Festival di Sanremo itself) The song was donated later to Pausini and readapted. The song was written by Niccolò Agliardi and Massimiliano Pelan; the Spanish language version was made by Ignacio Ballesteros and produced by Laura Pausini and Paolo Carta.

The song was also recorded in a Spanish-language version, titled "Bastaba" and released as the second single from the Spanish-language version of the album, Inédito.

Videoclip

The videoclip was directed by Gaetano Morbioli and took place in July 2011 in Amsterdam, same city where previous videoclips from Benvenuto and Non ho mai smesso were recorded.

The video was made available on January 26 on the site of the newspaper Corriere della Sera and on January 30 on all musical channels.

The video shows Laura Pausini dressed in a black and white dress, with her hair free, while singing in a very big room, surrounded by a videocamera that moves back and forth her. Scenes from Pausini's private life (such as backstage scenes from her DVD San Siro 2007) are also seen.

 Track list 
Digital download
 Bastava BastabaPersonnel
 Laura Pausini: Voice, composing
 Niccolò Agliardi: composing
 Massimiliano Pelan: composing
 Paolo Carta: composing, electric guitar
 Bruno Zucchetti: musical keyboard, piano
 Matteo Bassi: electric bass
 Emiliano Bassi: drums, percussion
 B.I.M. Orchestra: orchestra

Live performances
On December 26, 2011 Laura Pausini sang Bastava live with Eleonora Crupi at the Mediolanum Forum'' in Assago, Milano, as part of the Inedito World Tour

Charts

References

Laura Pausini songs
Atlantic Records singles
Italian-language songs
Spanish-language songs
2012 singles
2012 songs
Songs written by Niccolò Agliardi
Songs written by Laura Pausini